"Pat's Secret" is the 15th episode of the ninth season of the American sitcom Everybody Loves Raymond (1996–2005). The episode aired on May 9, 2005 on CBS.

Reception 
As of October 2019, "Pat's Secret" is the sixth highest-rated Raymond episode on IMDb with a rating of 8.6/10. Critics at Variety ranked it the second-best episode of any comedy series of the 2004–05 TV season. Summarized Screen Rant, "The stakes continually build throughout the episode and the subtle absurdity of it all makes this one comedy gold. It's always great to see such a strong episode so late in a series."

Awards 
Garrett won a Primetime Emmy Award for Outstanding Supporting Actor in a Comedy Series, which was for acting in "Pat's Secret" and "A Job for Robert." Both Wiilard and Engel were nominated for Primetime Emmy Awards for Outstanding Guest Actor in a Comedy Series and Outstanding Guest Actress in a Comedy Series respectively, which was for acting in "Pat's Secret," "A Date for Peter," and "Debra's Parents." Mike Berlin was also nominated for Outstanding Cinematography for a Multi-Camera Series for his work on "Pat's Secret."

References 

2005 American television episodes
Everybody Loves Raymond episodes